S.C.V. Bintang Lahir is a football club located in Groningen, Suriname. Their home games are played at the André Kamperveen Stadion in Paramaribo, and the division they play in is the SVB Eerste Divisie, the highest tier in Surinamese football.

History 
Bintang Lahir was founded in 1987.

In the 2017–18 season, the club won the third tier of Surinamese football, the SVB Derde Divisie, and were promoted to the SVB Tweede Divisie. They achieved a consecutive promotion by finishing runners-up in the second division in the 2018–19 season, therefore securing a spot in the 2019–20 SVB Eerste Divisie.

Honours

References 

Football clubs in Groningen, Suriname
Association football clubs established in 1987
1987 establishments in Suriname
Football clubs in Suriname